Šmarca is a settlement just south of Kamnik, on the right bank of the Kamnik Bistrica River,  in the Upper Carniola region of Slovenia.

The settlement was first mentioned in documents dating to 1359. The parish church in the settlement is dedicated to Saint Maurice.

References

External links

Šmarca on Geopedia

Populated places in the Municipality of Kamnik